Álex Palou Montalbo (born 1 April 1997) is a Spanish racing driver who drives for Chip Ganassi Racing in the IndyCar Series, where he won the 2021 series championship. He is the first Spanish racing driver to win a National Championship in American open-wheel racing history and also the first Spaniard to win in the GP3 Series.

Early years 
Born in Sant Antoni de Vilamajor, spanish racer Palou began karting in 2003. His biggest karting achievement was the championship title in the WSK Euro Series in 2012.

Euroformula Open 
Palou made his open-wheel racing debut, competing in the Euroformula Open Championship with Campos Racing in 2014. He bookended the season, winning the opening race at the Nürburgring and the final race at Circuit de Barcelona-Catalunya. He also won a race at the Hungaroring to finish third in the series standings, missing out on the runner-up placing by just one point to Artur Janosz.

Racing in Europe

GP3 Series

2015 
In 2015, Palou graduated to the GP3 Series with Campos Racing. During the first half of the season, he suffered major reliability issues as well as some driving mistakes due to his lack of experience, but his results improved along the season and he closed the year with a victory at Abu Dhabi.

At the Circuit de Barcelona-Catalunya of Spain, Palou qualified fourth for the first race, but he slipped the clutch at the start and lost any opportunity to fight for the points. He made another bad start at the second race.

At the Red Bull Ring of Austria, Palou had another bad weekend. Starting from third, he stalled the engine at the start. He later admitted he felt nervous after the mistakes from Barcelona and that that might have contributed to those new errors. He did not finish the second race because of a crash on the first lap.

At the Silverstone Circuit of England, a gear-box sensor failed when Palou was driving fifth. He was forced to retire and subsequently had to start the second race from the last place on the grid. He managed to overtake eleven cars, eight of them in the first lap, to finish 13th.

At the Hungaroring from Hungary, Palou started seventh and moved up to fifth until a car hit him from behind. He suffered a puncture and was forced to pit. Starting from the bottom of the grid for the second race, he wrapped up the weekend with an 18th-place finish.

At the Spa-Francorchamps Circuit from Belgium, Palou scored his first points in GP3 as the season passed its halfway point. Struggling with tyre wear and lack of speed, the Campos Racing driver finished in 7th place in the first race. He led most of the second race but eventually fell back to fifth because of the lack of top speed. He later argued that Esteban Ocon was scrapping 0,5 seconds per lap just in the first sector, where the Kemmel Straight was found.

At the Autodromo Nazionale di Monza from Italy, Palou had another difficult weekend because of the lack of top speed. Using the same engine he raced in Belgium, he managed to finish seventh in the first race and subsequently started the second one from the front row. He made "The Great Mistake" (as he wrote in his column) when during the warm-up lap he spun at the main straight and nearly hit the wall. Although his car was not damaged, he fell back to tenth.

At the Sochi Autodrom from Russia, Palou received a new engine that solved the top speed problems he suffered in Belgium and Italy. Because of Carlos Sainz crash during Russian Grand Prix Free Practice 3, the first race of the weekend was moved to Sunday. Palou qualified just a tenth away from Pole Position and scored a provisional season-high in the first race when he crossed the line in fourth place. He immediately scored a provisional season high when he crossed the line in fourth place. He was ninth in the second one.

At the Bahrain International Circuit of Bahrain, Palou suffered yet again more reliability issues. He started from fourth, but during the warm-up lap a gas sensor failed and the car kept on accelerating when the driver lifted the throttle. He decided to enter the Pit-Lane and retire. Because of this, he started the second race from last place. He gained 14 positions, but ended up tenth and outside from the points.

At the Yas Marina Circuit from Abu Dhabi, Palou won his race in GP3 and became the first Spanish driver to ever get a victory in the series. After being eighth in the first race, he held Pole Position for the second one. Worried about tyre wear, he targeted for a podium finish. He held the lead at the start and slowly started to pull away from the field. He crossed the line with a 4.4-second margin to Carlin's Antonio Fuoco.

2016 
Palou continued to race for Campos Racing in his second season in GP3. He scored second place at the Silverstone sprint race and fifth place at the Yas Marina sprint race. He ranked 15th in the overall standings.

World Series Formula V8 3.5

2017 

Palou also raced with Teo Martín Motorsport in three rounds of the 2017 World Series Formula V8 3.5 championship, where he won three poles and a race. This partial season earned him 10th in the championship. Palou finished 2017 with Campos Racing in two Formula 2 rounds, where he scored 5 points. Palou led the majority of the Jerez sprint race from the reverse grid pole, but ultimately, he could not hang on to the lead with his heavily worn tires and finished 8th. These two rounds finished Palou 21st in the championship.

FIA Formula 3 European Championship

2018 

In 2018, Palou returned to Europe full-time for a full season with Hitech Bullfrog GP in the 2018 FIA Formula 3 European Championship. He scored 7 podiums and ended the year 7th in the championship.

Racing in Japan

Japanese Formula 3 & World Series Formula V8 3.5

2017
Palou moved to Japan in 2017 to compete in Japanese Formula 3 for Threebond with Drago Corse. He won three races but finished the year third in the championship behind Mitsunori Takaboshi and Sho Tsuboi.

Super GT & Super Formula

2019

Palou moved back to Japan in 2019 to compete full-time with McLaren Customer Racing Japan in the Super GT GT300 class and TCS Nakajima Racing in Super Formula. In Super GT, Palou was partnered with 2004 24 Hours of Le Mans winner Seiji Ara. As a team, they scored one podium at Autopolis but ultimately finished 15th in the championship. In Super Formula, Palou had far more success. He won at Fuji Speedway from pole position and, after qualifying on pole at the final round at Suzuka, he looked to be the championship favorite. A problem with the ventilation duct early in the race immensely slowed Palou's car down and he finished 19th in the race. This dropped him to 3rd in the championship in the end.

IndyCar

Palou tested an IndyCar in July 2019 with Dale Coyne Racing at Mid-Ohio.

Dale Coyne Racing (2020)

2020: Rookie Season

On 19 December 2019, it was announced that Palou would move to the IndyCar Series for a rookie campaign with Dale Coyne Racing with Team Goh. His manager in the IndyCar series is former IndyCar driver Roger Yasukawa.

In his first race for the team at the 2020 Genesys 300 at Texas Motor Speedway he was taken out by fellow rookie Rinus VeeKay. He took his first IndyCar podium at Road America.

Chip Ganassi Racing (2021–Present)

2021
Palou was signed by Chip Ganassi Racing to drive the No. 10 Honda for the 2021 IndyCar Series season. On 18 April 2021, Palou earned his maiden IndyCar Series victory in the season-opening race at Barber Motorsports Park. Palou started on pole for the first time in his IndyCar career at the first race of the season at Texas Motor Speedway, although his pole position was earned due to his early-season championship point lead after qualifying was canceled for the race due to inclement weather. Palou added another podium for the season at the GMR Grand Prix and then finished second in the 2021 Indianapolis 500 to Hélio Castroneves' record-tying fourth victory. Palou's finish in the 500 vaulted him into the points lead for the championship. For the rest of the season, only himself and Pato O'Ward would hold the points lead.

Palou then went on a run of podium finishes after the 500, although he briefly lost the points lead to O'Ward in Detroit by a single point. Palou finished third in the second race in Detroit, won at Road America after Josef Newgarden suffered a gearbox failure, and finished third at Mid Ohio to solidify his points lead in the championship over both Scott Dixon and O'Ward. This was despite suffering three engine change related penalties imposed on him by IndyCar. He gave up the points lead to O'Ward after he and Dixon were collected in an accident caused by Rinus VeeKay at Gateway but took it back after taking his first earned pole position and a third victory at Portland. After a second-place finish at Laguna Seca, Palou carried a thirty-five-point advantage over O'Ward heading into the final race of the season at Long Beach, with only himself, O'Ward, and Josef Newgarden still mathematically capable of winning the title. After O'Ward was knocked out in an accident on the first lap of the race Palou drove conservatively and finished in fourth place, winning his first IndyCar championship. He became the third Chip Ganassi Racing driver to win the IndyCar series championship after Dixon and Dario Franchitti and the first Honda driver other than Dixon to win an IndyCar championship in the Dallara DW12 and turbo V6 era of IndyCar racing. Palou also secured his first IndyCar track discipline championship in 2021, winning the Mario Andretti Cup as the season's highest-scoring driver on the road and street courses. For his Indianapolis Motor Speedway victory lap, he drove a chicken-themed limousine, in honor of his favorite after-victory meal of fried chicken.

2022

Palou would start the 2022 season out with podiums at St. Petersburg, Long Beach, and Barber, outperforming his Chip Ganassi teammates and putting him in a strong early position to defend his title. The title would eventually be lost to Penske's Will Power, but Palou would still finish 5th (due to countback, as he tied Scott McLaughlin with 510 points) with a commanding win in the Laguna Seca finale to round out the year.

Contract controversy

On 12 July 2022, Chip Ganassi Racing sent a press release saying that they had extended the contract of Palou for the 2023 IndyCar season by exercising the option they held on his deal. Included in the press release was a quote attributed to Palou. Hours later, Palou, via a thread on Twitter denounced this press release, claimed that the quote attributed to him was created by the team (a practice common among IndyCar teams, according to RACER.coms Marshall Pruett) and also not approved by him. He also stated that he had given Chip Ganassi Racing prior notice that he intended to leave the team after the 2022 season and join McLaren Racing's roster of drivers. Moments after these tweets, McLaren announced that they had signed Palou to a contract for 2023, though it was not specifically mentioned if Palou would drive for Arrow McLaren SP, McLaren's IndyCar operation. Chip Ganassi Racing responded to this by releasing a statement reiterating their claim to Palou's services. On 27 July 2022, Chip Ganassi Racing confirmed they had filed a civil lawsuit against Palou in Marion County, Indiana. On 14 September 2022, it was announced that an agreement had been reached by all parties that would see Palou continue with Chip Ganassi for the 2023 season, with McLaren signing him to test the MCL35M.

 Formula One 
In September 2022, McLaren announced that they had signed Palou to their Testing of Previous Cars program that would see him test the MCL35M, first at the Circuit de Barcelona-Catalunya and later, in October, at the Red Bull Ring, both together with Pato O'Ward.

Palou made his debut in free practice with McLaren at the 2022 United States Grand Prix. On his free practice debut, Palou called the F1 car "insane" and "capable of so much".

On 1 December 2022, McLaren announced Palou as a reserve driver for the 2023 Formula One World Championship.

Racing record

Career summary

* Season still in progress.

Complete GP3 Series results
(key) (Races in bold indicate pole position) (Races in italics indicate fastest lap)

† Driver did not finish the race but was classified as he completed over 90% of the race distance.

Complete World Series Formula V8 3.5 results
(key) (Races in bold indicate pole position; races in italics indicate fastest lap)

Complete FIA Formula 2 Championship results
(key) (Races in bold indicate pole position) (Races in italics indicate points for the fastest lap of top ten finishers)

 Complete Formula One participations 
(key) (Races in bold indicate pole position) (Races in italics indicate fastest lap)

Complete FIA Formula 3 European Championship results
(key) (Races in bold indicate pole position) (Races in italics indicate fastest lap)

Complete Super GT results
(key) (Races in bold indicate pole position; races in italics indicate fastest lap)

Complete Super Formula results
(key) (Races in bold indicate pole position) (Races in italics indicate fastest lap)

American open-wheel racing results
(key) (Races in bold indicate pole position) (Races in italics indicate fastest lap)

IndyCar Series
(key)

* Season still in progress.

Indianapolis 500

Complete IMSA SportsCar Championship results
(key) (Races in bold''' indicate pole position; races in italics'' indicate fastest lap)

* Season still in progress.

References

External links

Álex Palou's columns of his first year in GP3

1997 births
Spanish racing drivers
Living people
People from Vallès Oriental
Sportspeople from the Province of Barcelona
Catalan racing drivers
IndyCar Series drivers
IndyCar Series champions
Indianapolis 500 drivers
Euroformula Open Championship drivers
Spanish GP3 Series drivers
Japanese Formula 3 Championship drivers
World Series Formula V8 3.5 drivers
FIA Formula 2 Championship drivers
FIA Formula 3 European Championship drivers
Campos Racing drivers
Teo Martín Motorsport drivers
Hitech Grand Prix drivers
Nakajima Racing drivers
Dale Coyne Racing drivers
Chip Ganassi Racing drivers
Super Formula drivers
Super GT drivers
WeatherTech SportsCar Championship drivers
Karting World Championship drivers
Fortec Motorsport drivers
Caterham Racing drivers
Ferrari Challenge drivers